This is a list of the National Register of Historic Places listings in Brown County, Wisconsin. It is intended to provide a comprehensive listing of entries in the National Register of Historic Places that are located in Brown County, Wisconsin.  The locations of National Register properties for which the latitude and longitude coordinates are included below may be seen in a map.

There are 62 properties and districts listed on the National Register in the county. Another two properties were once listed but have been removed.

Current listings

|}

Formerly listed

|}

See also

List of National Historic Landmarks in Wisconsin
National Register of Historic Places listings in Wisconsin
Listings in neighboring counties: Calumet, Kewaunee, Manitowoc, Oconto, Outagamie, Shawano

References

 
Brown